Saint-Julien-d'Eymet (Languedocien: Sent Júlia d'Aimet) is a former commune in the Dordogne department in Nouvelle-Aquitaine in southwestern France. On 1 January 2019, it was merged into the new commune Saint-Julien-Innocence-Eulalie.

Population

See also
Communes of the Dordogne department

References

Former communes of Dordogne